The Battle of Ōhaeawai, part of the Flagstaff War, was fought in July 1845 at Ōhaeawai in Northland, New Zealand. The battle was between British forces and their allies from the local Ngāpuhi tribe of Māori on one side, and other Ngāpuhi, led by Te Ruki Kawiti, a prominent rangatira (chief), on the other side. The battle was notable for establishing that an appropriately built fortified pā could withstand bombardment from cannon fire, with a frontal assault by soldiers suffering heavy casualties.

Kawiti's success at Ōhaeawai Pā

In the winter of 1845 Lieutenant Colonel Henry Despard led a combined force of troops from the 58th, 96th, and 99th Regiments, Royal Marines and Māori allies in an attack on Pene Taui's pā, which had been fortified by Kawiti.

On the summit of a nearby hill (Puketapu) they built a four-gun battery. They opened fire next day and continued until dark but did very little damage to the palisade. The next day the guns were brought to within  of the pā. The bombardment continued for another two days but still did very little damage. Partly this was due to the elasticity of the flax covering the palisade. Since the introduction of muskets the Māori had learnt to cover the outside of the palisades with layers of flax (Phormium tenax) leaves, making them effectively bulletproof as the velocity of musket balls was dissipated by the flax leaves. However the main fault was a failure to concentrate the cannon fire on one area of the defences, so as to create a breach in the palisade.

After two days of bombardment without effecting a breach, Despard ordered a frontal assault. He was, with difficulty, persuaded to postpone this pending the arrival of a 32-pound naval gun which came the next day, 1 July. However an unexpected sortie from the pā resulted in the temporary occupation of the knoll on which Tāmati Wāka Nene had his camp and the capture of Nene's colours—the Union Jack. The Union Jack was carried into the pā. There it was hoisted, upside down, and at half-mast high, below the Māori flag, which was a kākahu (Māori cloak). This insulting display of the Union Jack was the cause of the disaster which ensued. Infuriated by the insult to the Union Jack, Colonel Despard ordered an assault upon the pā the same day. The attack was directed to the section of the pā where the angle of the palisade allowed a double flank from which the defenders of the pā could fire at the attackers; the attack was a reckless endeavour. The British persisted in their attempts to storm the unbreached palisades and five to seven minutes later 33 were dead and 66 injured. The scalp of Lieutenant Phillpotts was brought to the tohunga Te Atua Wera, who made divinations and composed a song foretelling victory against the British. The casualties were buried at  St. John the Baptist Church at Waimate North.

Shaken by the loss of a third of his troops, Despard decided to abandon the siege. However, his Māori allies contested this decision. Tāmati Wāka Nene persuaded Despard to wait for a few more days. More ammunition and supplies were brought in and the shelling continued. On the morning of 8 July the pā was found to have been abandoned, the occupants having disappeared in the night. When they had a chance to examine it, the British officers found it to be even stronger than they had feared.

The defenders of the pā had four iron cannons on ship-carriages including a carronade that was loaded with a bullock-chain, and fired at close quarters at the attacking soldiers. The colonial forces captured these cannons, one of which had been destroyed by a shot from a British cannon.

Captain William Biddlecomb Marlow, RE, noted in relation to his drawing, Plate IV, of Ōhaeawai pā:
The dotted lines denote rows of fences composed of trees deeply sunk in the ground, between 9 and 15 inches thick, bound close together by a strong native line or rope at the top and bottom: upon the outer row of trees a screen between 4 and 6 inches thick, and 8 and 9 feet high, was formed from a native plant called the New Zealand flax, which is exceedingly tough, and at a distance capable of resisting a musket-ball.
This screen was kept about 18 inches above the ground, to serve as loop-holes to fire through from the trench marked T T, Plate IV., figs. 13 and 14; S S serving as traverses.
In front of the inner palisade was a ditch in which the warriors could shelter and reload their muskets then fire through gaps in the two outer palisades.

Relying on the report of her husband Henry who observed the battle, Marianne Williams commented on the ingenuity of the construction of the war pā in a letter to Mrs. Heathcote, 5 July 1845:

The pā was duly destroyed and the British retreated once again to the Bay of Islands. Te Ruki Kawiti and his warriors escaped and proceeded to construct an even stronger pā at Ruapekapeka. The Battle of Ōhaeawai was presented as a victory for the British force, notwithstanding the death of about a third of the soldiers. The reality of the end of the Battle of Ōhaeawai was that Kawiti and his warriors had abandoned the pā in a tactical withdrawal, with the Ngāpuhi moving on to build the Ruapekapeka Pā from which to engage the British force on a battle field chosen by Kawiti.

Hone Heke did not participate in the Battle of Ōhaeawai as he was recovering from the wounds he received at the Battle of Te Ahuahu.

Model for the gunfighter pā
After the battle, models were made of the design of the pā, with one being sent to Britain where it sat forgotten in a museum. Other Māori tribes of New Zealand became aware of the techniques used in the design of the Ōhaeawai Pā in order to blunt the effectiveness of cannon and musket fire and to create firing trenches located within the inner palisade and communication trenches linking to ruas—shelters dug into the ground and covered with earth. The design of the Ōhaeawai Pā, and the pā subsequently built by Kawiti at Ruapekapeka, became the basis of what is now called the "gunfighter pā".

Site of the battle
Saint Michael's Anglican Church was built on the site of the Ōhaeawai pā in 1871. While the area is now called Ngawha, it was known as Ōhaeawai at the time. James Cowan identified that "the site of the Ōhaeawai pā is now occupied by a Maori church and burying-ground. The scene of the battle is five miles from Kaikohe and two miles from the Township of Ōhaeawai. A Maori church of old-fashioned design is seen on the left as one travels from Kaikohe; it stands on a gentle rise a short distance west of the main road. The locality is usually called Ngawha, from the hot springs in the neighbourhood, but it is the true Ōhaeawai; the European township which has appropriated the name should properly be known as Taiamai. The church occupies the centre of the olden fortification, and a scoria-stone wall, 7 ft. high, encloses the sacred ground."

The soldiers and sailors' memorial stands in the churchyard. The Maori inscription reads, with translation:
Ko te tohu tapu tenei o nga hoia me nga heremana o te Kuini i hinga i te whawhai ki konei ki Ohaeawai i te tau o to tatou ariki 1845. Ko tenei urupa na nga Maori i whaka-takoto I muri iho i te maunga rongo.

This is a sacred memorial to the soldiers and sailors of the Queen who fell in battle here at Ohaeawai in the year of Our Lord 1845. This burying place was laid out by the Maoris after the making of peace.

See also
New Zealand wars
Pakaraka

References

Sources
 
 
 
 

Conflicts in 1845
Forts in New Zealand
Far North District
July 1845 events
Flagstaff War